Richard J. Bunt (July 13, 1929 – February 10, 2021) was an American basketball player who played in the National Basketball Association (NBA) during the 1952–53 season.

He played collegiately for New York University and was selected by the New York Knicks in the 1952 NBA draft.

Bunt played for the Knicks and Baltimore Bullets in the NBA for 26 games.  After he finished his NBA career, he was a physical education teacher at William C. Bryant High School in Astoria, Queens, New York.

Bunt died on February 10, 2021, at age 91, in Purdys, New York.

References

External links

1930 births
2021 deaths
American Basketball League (1925–1955) players
American men's basketball coaches
American men's basketball players
Baltimore Bullets (1944–1954) players
Basketball coaches from New York (state)
Basketball players from New York City
Bayside High School (Queens) alumni
High school basketball coaches in New York (state)
Manchester British Americans players
New York Knicks draft picks
New York Knicks players
NYU Violets men's basketball players
Point guards
Sportspeople from Queens, New York